Alkaline phosphatase, intestinal also known as ALPI is a type of alkaline phosphatase that in humans is encoded by the ALPI gene.

References

External links

Further reading